Primo Carnera (26 October 1906 – 29 June 1967),  nicknamed the Ambling Alp, was an Italian professional boxer and wrestler who reigned as the boxing World Heavyweight Champion from 29 June 1933 to 14 June 1934. He won more fights by knockout than any other heavyweight champion (IBU, NBA, NYSAC) in boxing history.

Personal life

Primo Carnera was born in Sequals, then in the Province of Udine, now in the Province of Pordenone, Friuli-Venezia Giulia at the north-easternmost corner of Italy.

On 13 March 1939, Carnera married Giuseppina Kovačič (1913–1980), a post office clerk from Gorizia. In 1953, they received dual citizenship. They settled in Los Angeles, where Carnera opened a restaurant and a liquor store. They had two children, Umberto and Giovanna Maria. Umberto became a medical doctor.

Professional boxing career

Overview
Though  shorter than Willard, Carnera was around  heavier and was the heaviest champion in boxing history until Valuev.

He enjoyed a sizable reach advantage over most rivals, and when seen on fight footage, he seems like a towering giant compared to many heavyweights of his era, who were usually at least  lighter and  shorter. One publicity release about him read in part: "For breakfast, Primo has a quart of orange juice, two quarts of milk, nineteen pieces of toast, fourteen eggs, a loaf of bread and half a pound of Virginia ham." His size earned him the nickname "The Ambling Alp". Time magazine called him "The Monster".

Starting career
12 September 1928 was the date of Carnera's first professional fight, against Leon Sebilo, in Paris. Carnera won by knockout in round two. He won his first six bouts, then lost to Franz Diener by disqualification in round one at Leipzig. Then, he won seven more bouts in a row before meeting Young Stribling. He and Stribling exchanged disqualification wins, Carnera winning the first in four rounds, and Stribling winning the rematch in round seven. In Carnera's next bout he avenged his defeat to Diener with a knockout in round six.

In 1930, he moved to the United States, where he toured extensively, winning his first seventeen bouts there by knockout. George Godfrey broke the knockout streak in Philadelphia by losing to Carnera by disqualification in the fifth round. In 1932, Carnera faced the tallest heavyweight in history up to that point, Santa Camarão, a  Portuguese fighter. Carnera won the fight in a sixth-round knockout.

On 10 February 1933, he knocked out Ernie Schaaf in thirteen rounds in New York City. Schaaf died four days later. Schaaf had suffered a severe beating and knockout in a bout with future heavyweight champion Max Baer six months earlier, on 31 August 1932. Furthermore, an autopsy revealed that Schaaf had meningitis, a swelling of the brain, and was still recovering from a severe case of influenza when he entered the ring with Carnera.

World Heavyweight Champion 
For his next fight, Carnera faced the world heavyweight champion, Jack Sharkey, on June 29, at the Madison Square Garden Bowl in Queens, New York. Carnera became world champion by knocking out Sharkey in round six.

He retained the title against Paulino Uzcudun and Tommy Loughran, both by decision in 15 rounds, but in his next fight on 14 June 1934 against Max Baer, Carnera was knocked down multiple times in 11 rounds, before referee Arthur Donovon stopped the fight. There is disagreement regarding how many times Carnera was knocked down, with sources giving conflicting totals of 7, 10, 11 (per Associated Press) and 12 (per The Ring magazine founder Nat Fleischer, ringside for the fight, who wrote that Carnera was knocked down 12 times and slipped once after a missed punch).

After defeat 
After that, Carnera won his next four fights, three of them as part of a South American tour that took him to Brazil, Argentina and Uruguay, as well as two exhibitions fought on the South American continent. But then, on 25 June 1935, he was knocked out in six rounds by Joe Louis.

For the next two and a half years, he won five and lost three of eight total fights. But in 1938, Carnera, a diabetic, had to have a kidney removed, which forced him into retirement by 1944. Carnera's record was 89 wins and 14 losses. His 72 wins by knockout made him a member of the exclusive club of boxers that won 50 or more bouts by knockout.

Carnera died in 1967 in his native town of a combination of liver disease and complications from diabetes.

Legacy in boxing
Carnera was the third European to hold the world heavyweight championship after Bob Fitzsimmons and Max Schmeling. He would be the last until Ingemar Johansson claimed the title against Floyd Patterson in 1959, over a quarter of a century later.

Carnera was also the first boxer to win the European Heavyweight title and subsequently become World Heavyweight champion.

Carnera's 1933 title defense against Tommy Loughran held the record for the greatest weight differential between two combatants in a world title fight for 73 years until the reign of Nikolai Valuev, who owns the current record for the  weight advantage he held in his 2006 defense against Monte Barrett.

Carnera still ranks as the fourth-heaviest, behind Valuev, Tyson Fury and Andy Ruiz Jr., over eighty years after he held the title.

Carnera's 1933 title defense against Paulino Uzcudun in Italy was the first Heavyweight title fight to be held in Europe since Jack Johnson's title defence against Frank Moran in Paris in 1913. It would be the last such occasion until Muhammad Ali defended the title against Henry Cooper in London in 1966. Carnera-Uzcudun was the first World Heavyweight championship fight to be contested between two Europeans. It would be another sixty years, when Lennox Lewis defended the WBC heavyweight title against fellow-Englishman Frank Bruno in 1993, that this would occur again. 

Carnera's 72 career knockouts is the most of any world heavyweight champion (IBU, NBA, NYSAC).

Acting career

Carnera appeared in a short film in 1931. During his tenure as world champion he played a fictional version of himself in the 1933 film The Prizefighter and the Lady starring Max Baer and Myrna Loy. Here he plays the heavyweight champion who barely holds onto his title with a draw decision after a furious fight with Baer. The film was made just a year before Carnera fought Baer for real, in a bout that was as wild as the film version, but ended with a knockout loss for Carnera.

Carnera had a bit part in the 1949 movie Mighty Joe Young. He played himself in the tug-of-war scene with the giant gorilla. After being pulled by the ape into a pool of water, Carnera throws a couple of futile punches to Joe's chin.

He also played a bully boy wrestler in Carol Reed's A Kid for Two Farthings (1955). Set in London's Petticoat Lane Market, the film pits Carnera's character against a local bodybuilder who is to marry another character named Sonia, played by Diana Dors.

Primo appeared in at least ten Italian films between 1939 and 1943, as well as several in the 1950s, like Prince Valiant, in the role of Sligon. His last screen role was as the giant Antaeus alongside Steve Reeves in Hercules Unchained (US title, filmed in Italy, 1959, original title Ercole e la regina di Lidia).

Professional wrestling career
In 1945 he temporarily returned to boxing and won two fights. But the next year, after three losses against Luigi Musina his talent for wrestling was discovered. In 1946 he became a professional wrestler and was immediately a huge success at the box office. For several years he was one of the top draws in wrestling. Carnera continued to be an attraction into the 1960s. Max Baer attended at least one of Carnera's wrestling matches.

Carnera won his debut on 22 August 1946, when he defeated Tommy O'Toole in California. On 23 October 1946, Carnera won his 41st consecutive wrestling match by defeating Jules Strongbow. On 19 November 1946, Carnera beat Harry Kruskamp to remain undefeated at 65–0–0. Primo Carnera went 120 straight wrestling matches undefeated (119–0–1) before suffering his first loss to Yvon Robert in Montreal, Quebec, Canada, on 20 August 1947. Carnera's greatest victory took place on 7 December 1947 when he defeated former world heavyweight champion Ed "Strangler" Lewis.

In May 1948, Carnera took a 143–1–1 record against world heavyweight champion Lou Thesz. Thesz defeated Carnera in a world title defense.

Mob accusations

According to boxing historian Herbert Goldman, Carnera was "very much mob controlled." Carnera met his first serious heavyweight contender, Young Stribling, in 1929, and won when Stribling fouled him. In a rematch, he fouled Stribling. His 1930 fight against California club fighter Bombo Chevalier in Emeryville was considered fixed, and Carnera was banned from fighting in California. His 1930 match against George Godfrey was controversial, as Godfrey was disqualified in the sixth round when he was clearly getting the better of Carnera.

Time magazine, in a 5 October 1931 cover story on Carnera before he won the heavyweight title, commented on his odd career:

Depictions in popular culture

In film
Requiem for a Heavyweight, Rod Serling's 1956 Emmy Award-winning teleplay for Playhouse 90 directed by Ralph Nelson (who also won an Emmy), focused on down-and-out former heavyweight boxer Harlan "Mountain" McClintock. The travails of McClintock, who was played by Jack Palance (Sean Connery played the part on British television and Anthony Quinn essayed the role in the 1962 film), was thought by many boxing fans to resemble Carnera's life.

In 1947, fighting aficionado Budd Schulberg wrote The Harder They Fall, a novel about a giant boxer whose fights are fixed. It was adapted into Mark Robson's 1956 film, which starred Humphrey Bogart and Rod Steiger. A highlight was the appearance of Max Baer, playing a fighter the mob could not fix who destroys the giant in his first fair fight. Critics drew parallels with the real-life Baer-Carnera fight two decades before. In response, Carnera unsuccessfully sued the film's company.

Carnera played himself in the 1949 movie Mighty Joe Young.

Carnera was played by Matthew G. Taylor in the 2005 film Cinderella Man, a film about the life of fellow boxer James J. Braddock.

In 2008, the actor Andrea Iaia played Carnera in the Italian biographical film Carnera: The Walking Mountain, directed by Renzo Martinelli.

In 2013, Emporio Elaborazioni Meccaniche named a motorbike, the 1983 BMW R80RT Carnera, in honor of Carnera.

In comics
In 1947, Carnera, an Italian comic book series sporting a fictional version of Primo Carnera, was produced. In 1953, it was translated into German. A facsimile version was published in 2010.

Another popular Italian comic character, Dick Fulmine, was graphically inspired by Carnera.

In literature
Carnera is mentioned by Bertie Wooster in the 1934 novel Right Ho, Jeeves, by P.G. Wodehouse on p. 234.

In his 1933 collection of short stories Mulliner Nights, Wodehouse described one character as follows: "He was built on large lines, and seemed to fill the room to overflowing. In physique he was not unlike what Primo Carnera would have been if Carnera hadn't stunted his growth by smoking cigarettes when a boy."

Carrera's fight with Walter Neusel is described in One-storied America by Soviet authors Ilf and Petrov (1937).

Carnera is mentioned by Julian “Digger” Burroughs in the 1982 novel Lucifer’s Weekend, by Warren Murphy on p. 81.

In music
Carnera is mentioned in Cambalache, a 1934 tango song by Enrique Santos Discépolo that was featured in the musical drama film The Soul of the Accordion.

The Yeasayer song Ambling Alp, from their 2010 album Odd Blood references Carnera by his nickname in the title and second verse. Both Carnera and German boxer Max Schmeling are referenced for their bouts with American Joe Louis.

Professional boxing record
All information in this section is derived from BoxRec, unless otherwise stated.

Official record

All newspaper decisions are officially regarded as “no decision” bouts and are not counted in the win/loss/draw column.

Unofficial record

Record with the inclusion of newspaper decisions in the win/loss/draw column.

Championships and accomplishments

Boxing
International Boxing Union
IBU Heavyweight Championship (22 October 1933 – 21 June 1935; vacated)
National Boxing Association
NBA World Heavyweight Championship (29 June 1933 – 14 June 1934)
New York State Athletic Commission
NYSAC World Heavyweight Championship (29 June 1933 – 14 June 1934)

Professional wrestling
NWA Hollywood Wrestling
NWA International Television Tag Team Championship (1 time) – with Bobo Brazil
NWA San Francisco
NWA World Tag Team Championship (San Francisco version) (1 time) – with Sandor Szabo
 WWE
WWE Hall of Fame (Class of 2019)

See also
 Walk of Fame of Italian sport
 List of heavyweight boxing champions

References

Bibliography

External links
 
 
 Primo Carnera – CBZ Profile
 Biography: Primo Carnera
 
 Primo Carnera Photos
 

1906 births
1967 deaths
People from the Province of Pordenone
Heavyweight boxers
Italian male boxers
Italian male film actors
Italian emigrants to the United States
American male boxers
American people of Italian descent
Italian male professional wrestlers
World heavyweight boxing champions
20th-century Italian male actors
Articles containing video clips
WWE Hall of Fame Legacy inductees
Stampede Wrestling alumni
Deaths from liver disease
Deaths from diabetes
Sportspeople from Friuli-Venezia Giulia
20th-century professional wrestlers